Fietz is a German surname. Notable people with the surname include:

Michael Fietz (born 1967), German long-distance runner
Siegfried Fietz (born 1946), German singer-songwriter, composer, music producer, and sculptor

See also
Fitz
Lietz

German-language surnames